The Roman Catholic Diocese of Pereira is a diocese located in the city of Pereira in the Ecclesiastical province of Manizales in Colombia.

History
 17 December 1952: Established as Diocese of Pereira from the Diocese of Manizales and Apostolic Prefecture of Chocó

Bishops

Ordinaries
Baltasar Alvarez Restrepo (1952.12.18 – 1976.07.01)
Darío Castrillón Hoyos (1976.07.01 – 1992.12.16) Appointed, Archbishop of Bucaramanga; future Cardinal
Fabio Suescún Mutis (1993.11.20 – 2001.01.19) Appointed, Bishop of Colombia, Military
Tulio Duque Gutiérrez, S.D.S. (2001.07.25 – 2011.07.15)
Rigoberto Corredor Bermúdez (2011.07.15 – present)

Coadjutor bishop
Darío Castrillón Hoyos (1971-1976); future Cardinal

Auxiliary bishops
Rigoberto Corredor Bermúdez (1988-1996), appointed Bishop of Buenaventura (later returned here as Bishop)
Hernán Giraldo Jaramillo (1984-1987), appointed Bishop of Málaga-Soatá
Luis Albeiro Cortés Rendón (2015-2022)

Other priests of this diocese who became bishops
Julio Hernando García Peláez, appointed Auxiliary Bishop of Cali in 2005
Rubén Darío Jaramillo Montoya, appointed Bishop of Buenaventura in 2017

See also
Roman Catholicism in Colombia

Sources

External links
 Catholic Hierarchy
 GCatholic.org
  Diocese website

Pereira, Colombia
Roman Catholic dioceses in Colombia
Roman Catholic Ecclesiastical Province of Manizales
Christian organizations established in 1952
Roman Catholic dioceses and prelatures established in the 20th century
1952 establishments in Colombia